Nicolas Eustache Maurin (1799–1850) was a French painter, lithographer and engraver. His lithographs, particularly those characteristic of their period, are highly sought after.

Life 
Nicolas Eustache Maurin was born in Perpignan, Pyrénées-Orientales, on 6 March 1799. He was the younger son of the painter Pierre Maurin; his elder brother was the painter Antoine Maurin.

Maurin received his first artistic lessons in his father's studio. He received an allowance from the town and the department to study in Paris, which enabled him to enter Henri Regnault's studio as a pupil. He exhibited at the Paris Salon in 1833, 1834, and 1835.

He established himself as a lithographer in 1830 and distinguished himself mainly with some amusing and erotic pictures of different types of women. He is notable as a painter of fashions and manners; examples include: Love, Modesty, Tenderness, Tender Avowal, Love Match, Nuptial Chamber, Day after the Wedding, Sacred and Profane, and Maternal and Conjugal Love.

He also produced the series Iconography of Contemporaries (Iconographie des contemporains), and a series of 163 portraits entitled Contemporary Celebrities (Célébrités contemporaines).

Maurin died in Passy, Paris on 7 October 1850, aged fifty-one.

Selected works

Portraits 

 Portrait du général polonais Joseph Dwernicki (Salon, 1833, no. 2,899)
 Portrait du général polonais Pac (Salon, 1833, no. 2,900)
 Portrait du médecin français Gilbert Breschet

Illustrations 

 Victor Hugo: Notre-Dame de Paris (Paris, 1831)
 Goethe: Faust. Une tragédie (Paris 1838)

Lithographs 

 La toilette, after Prud'hon, 21 x 17 cm (Musée Baron Martin)
 Le triomphe de Bonaparte, after Prud'hon, 35 x 52 cm (Musée Baron Martin)

Notes

References 

 Oliver, Valerie Cassel, ed. (2011). "Maurin, Nicolas Eustache". In Benezit Dictionary of Artists. Oxford University Press.
 Thurmair, Katharina (2021). "Maurin, Nicolas Eustache". In Andreas Beyer, Bénédicte Savoy and Wolf Tegethoff (eds.). Allgemeines Künstlerlexikon Online. De Gruyter.
 "Décès. V3E/D 1033, 40/51". Archives de Paris. (n.d.). Retrieved 22 April 2022.

External links 

 "Nicolas-Eustache Maurin (1799-1850)". BnF Data. (n.d.). Retrieved 22 April 2022.
 "Nicolas Eustache Maurin". British Museum. (n.d.). Retrieved 22 April 2022.
 "Nicolas Eustache Maurin". National Portrait Gallery. (n.d.). Retrieved 22 April 2022.

1799 births
1850 deaths
19th-century French painters
19th-century French lithographers
19th-century French male artists
19th-century French engravers
French erotic artists
French male painters